Infestation 2 (stylized in some solicitations as Infes2ation) is a crossover event that was published by IDW Publishing from January to April 2012. Serving as the sequel to Infestation, it consisted of two book-end one-shots, and two-issue limited series from The Transformers, Dungeons & Dragons, Teenage Mutant Ninja Turtles, G.I. Joe and 30 Days of Night.

Premise
A new threat emerges as Great Old Ones (based on the work of H. P. Lovecraft) break free from their cosmic prison and invade the universes of CVO: Covert Vampiric Operations, The Transformers: Hearts of Steel, Dungeons & Dragons, Teenage Mutant Ninja Turtles, G.I. Joe and 30 Days of Night, affecting the fabric of reality.

Titles

Infestation 2 #1-2
Published from January to April 2012. Written by Duane Swierczynski with art by David Messina.

Infestation 2: The Transformers #1-2
Published biweekly in February 2012. Written by Chuck Dixon with art by Guido Guidi. The series is not a direct sequel to The Transformers: Infestation and takes place in the universe of The Transformers: Hearts of Steel.

Infestation 2: Dungeons & Dragons #1-2
Published biweekly in February 2012. Written by Paul Crilley with art by Valerio Schiti.

Infestation 2: Team-Up #1
Published in February 2012. Written by Chris Ryall with art by Alan Robinson. It is a humorous take on the event and features Archie from Groom Lake and Bat Boy from Weekly World News.

Infestation 2: Teenage Mutant Ninja Turtles #1-2
Published biweekly in March 2012. Written by Tristan Jones with art by Mark Torres.

Infestation 2: G.I. Joe #1-2
Published biweekly in March 2012. Written by Mike Raicht with art by Valentine de Landro.

Infestation 2: 30 Days of Night #1
Published in April 2012. Written by Duane Swierczynski with art by Stuart Sayger.

References 

2011 comics debuts
2011 comics endings
Dungeons & Dragons comics
Comics based on Star Trek
Transformers comics
Cthulhu Mythos stories
IDW Publishing titles
30 Days of Night
G.I. Joe comics
Teenage Mutant Ninja Turtles comics
Comics about parallel universes